The Werribee River is a perennial river of the Port Phillip catchment that is located on the expansive lowland plain southwest of Melbourne, Victoria, Australia. The headwaters of a tributary, the Lerderderg River, are north of Ballan near Daylesford and it flows across the basalt plain, through the suburb of Werribee to enter Port Phillip. A linear park follows the Werribee River along much of its course.

The river flows through the Werribee Gorge State Park before being utilised for irrigation of market gardens at Bacchus Marsh, then through Werribee where it is crossed by the Maltby By-pass. It then flows through the Werribee Open Range Zoo in Werribee Park, and finally the small coastal settlement of Werribee South before entering Port Phillip. The Western Treatment Plant, a sewage treatment site, is located near the mouth of the river, and supplies irrigation needs to the zoo.

The Werribee River Trail winds beside the Werribee River from Davis Creek in Tarneit to the Princes Highway in Werribee.

History
Before the arrival of settlers, the Werribee River was the boundary of the Bunurong tribe whose six clans lived along the Victorian coast across the Mornington Peninsula, Western Port Bay to Wilsons Promontory.

In the late 1830s and 1840s, the Werribee River was the scene of conflict between the Wautharong people and the European colonisers. The squatter Charles Franks and a shepherd were speared to death near Mount Cottrell in July 1836. This resulted in the Mount Cottrell Massacre – a punitive party led by John Batman which came upon a large party of Aboriginal people and indiscriminately shot and killed at least ten, There are accounts of arsenic-laced flour being given to them.

In 1851, a substantial timber bridge was built to cross the Werribee River to replace an earlier wooden bridge. In 1852, this bridge was washed away when the Werribee river flooded.

In August 2004, the Victorian Government pledged 300,000 towards restoring the Werribee River, removing willows choking the river around the township and replacing them with native plants in a habitat restoration project.

Etymology
The Hume and Hovell expedition camped by the river on 15 December 1824 and named it the Arndell after Hovell's father-in-law. John Helder Wedge 're-discovered' the river in 1835 and initially called it the Peel, but then decided to call it the Ex or Exe. The name of the town of Exford, an early crossing place on the river, is derived from this name. One of the local Wathaurong-speaking Kulin tribesman that accompanied Wedge said the name for the stream was 'Weariby Yallock' (yallock meaning 'stream'). The spelling changed to the present form of Werribee, the original Aboriginal root word meaning spine or backbone.

Fishing

Werribee River holds fish all along its course, most of which are at the mouth of the river into Port Phillip Bay in the estuary. This area is best fished for southern black bream.

Features and highlights

See also

 List of rivers of Australia

Gallery

References

External links
Werribee River – Redreaming the plain

Melbourne Water catchment
Rivers of Grampians (region)
Rivers of Greater Melbourne (region)
Bacchus Marsh
City of Melton
City of Wyndham